Dragon Quest is a series of role-playing video games created by Yuji Horii, which are published by Square Enix (formerly Enix). The first game of the series was released in Japan in 1986 on the Nintendo Entertainment System, and Dragon Quest games have subsequently been localized for markets in North America, Europe and Australia, on over a dozen video game consoles. In addition to traditional role-playing games, the series includes first-person adventure games, portable games, massively multiplayer online role-playing games, and games for mobile phones. Dragon Quest is Square Enix's second most successful franchise internationally behind the Final Fantasy franchise, having sold over 78 million units worldwide to date. It has been cited as Japan's most popular and favorite gaming series by many publications.

The original game in the series, renamed Dragon Warrior outside Japan, was released in 1986 in Japan and in North America in 1989. Dragon Quest games are released in Japan and, until 2004's Dragon Quest VIII, were later localized for the North American market under the Dragon Warrior title. That game was also the first main series game to be released outside Japan and North America. In addition to the 11 games released as part of the main (numbered) series and their many spin-offs and related titles, the Dragon Quest series has spawned many works in other media including anime, movies, novels and manga, and radio dramas. Many games, particularly the main series, have soundtrack album releases featuring their music in different arrangements. Square Enix has also released companion books for its games, which provide additional backstory and plot information, as well as detailed strategy guides. The majority of the games and media related to the series have only been released in Japan, although the series began to see more international popularity beginning in the 2010s.

Video games

Main series

Spin-offs

Dragon Quest Monsters
, initially known as Dragon Warrior Monsters in North America, is a series of Dragon Quest games focused on capturing, breeding, and raising monsters to do battle, similar to Pokémon games.

Mystery Dungeon
 is a series of roguelike video games. There are several games in the series based on Dragon Quest, as well as on other series such as Pokémon.

Slime
 is a series of Dragon Quest action-adventure games starring the Slime, a common enemy and mascot of the series.

Monster Battle Road
 is a series of arcade and video games focused on collecting real-life cards with monster data imprinted on them and using them to battle opponents.

The Adventure of Dai
A project focused on three games based on the 2020 anime adaptation of the Dragon Quest: The Adventure of Dai manga.

Other

Television and film

Books and manga

Music and soundtracks

Footnotes

References

Media lists by video games franchise
 
Dragon Quest